Pinduoduo Inc. (Pinyin: Pīn duōduō) is a subsidiary of PDD Holdings. It leverages technology to promote and enable the traditional agriculture industry. It has created a platform that connects farmers with consumers directly. In 2021, 16 million farmers supplied their fruits and vegetables to Pinduoduo users.

The company generated RMB 2.44 trillion (US$383 billion) gross merchandise value (GMV) in 2021. For the 12 months ending on March 31, 2022, Pinduoduo's annual active buyers reached 881.9 million.

History 
Founded in 2015 by PDD Holdings, Pinduoduo started as an agriculture online retailer before transitioning to a third-party platform model connecting merchants and consumers across multiple product categories.

In 2019, Pinduoduo invested in building an agriculture-focused logistics infosystem that employs smart algorithms to better plan transportation routes. The logistics system laid the foundations for a next-day, click-and-collect grocery service, Duo Duo Grocery, in August 2020, as a response to the changing consumer needs for buying groceries in the wake of the COVID-19 pandemic. As traditional wholesale markets closed during the pandemic outbreak, Pinduoduo worked with rural communities to sell unsold produce directly to consumers. In July 2021, Pinduoduo converted its distribution centres in Henan into temporary food banks, handing out essentials like rice, noodles and bottled water.

In September 2022, Pinduoduo's sister company Temu was launched in the U.S. by PDD Holdings.

Tech for agriculture 
As a platform connecting millions of farmers and consumers, Pinduoduo sees the potential for technology to bring positive changes to the millennia-old activity of agriculture. The company's Tech for Agri approach is centered on increasing market accessibility, improving digital inclusion and literacy, and fostering innovation as key enablers for agricultural modernization.

Pinduoduo's digital platform improves the matching of buyers and sellers in agriculture, giving millions of farmers the opportunity to boost their incomes through direct access to a wider consumer market, from which they had largely been excluded.

To ensure that farmers are equipped with the right digital skills and to enlarge the talent pool for digital agriculture, Pinduoduo has developed a comprehensive suite of online courses to teach farmers grow their online businesses. The company has trained more than 100,000 e-commerce savvy New Farmers, who have gone on inspire others in their communities to follow suit.

Pinduoduo works with top universities to undertake research into ways to boost the productivity of agriculture while reducing its impact on the environment. The company has organized an annual Smart Agriculture Competition since 2020 that challenges data scientists and agricultural researchers to develop practical precision farming technology as part of efforts to promote sustainable, innovation-led growth in agriculture.

Social commerce 
Pinduoduo is known for its interactivity and value-for-money offers.

Users can discover and purchase products from a wide range of sellers. What sets Pinduoduo apart is the social aspect where users can easily share what they have browsed or purchased with their social network to shop together. Users get a clear benefit of shopping together while still having the convenience of getting the product shipped to them individually. This drives greater sales volume for sellers, allowing them to continue offering value-for-money prices due to economies of scale. Pinduoduo scored higher than its online peers in the brand attributes of adventurous, fun, and playful.

Consumer to manufacturer (C2M) 
Pinduoduo has pioneered the concept of "consumer to manufacturer" (“C2M”) to help merchants tailor make products for its diverse user base. The consumer-to-manufacturing (C2M) model aims to provide real time information to producers so that they can produce according to fast changing consumer demand. By cutting down on unnecessary production and guess work, fewer resources are needed and the cost savings can be passed on to consumers.

Thus far, Pinduoduo has partnered with a variety of manufacturers in different industries to develop tailor-made products for its users. According to MIT Technology Review, in 2019, 106 manufacturer-owned brands were launched on Pinduoduo.

Investments and partnerships 

In April 2020, Pinduoduo made its first strategic investment by subscribing to US$200 million in convertible bonds issued by Gome Retail Holding, a major household appliance and electronics retailer in China. This investment is expected to strengthen Pinduoduo's position in the household appliances and electronics sector and also accelerate its push into C2M, with more tailor-made appliances made available to its users.

In August 2021, Pinduoduo announced it would launch a dedicated 10 Billion Agriculture Initiative to face and address critical needs in the agricultural sector and rural areas.

Controversy 
In 2018, Pinduoduo came under scrutiny following a spate of negative press calling the company out for inferior and imitation products. The company responded with an open letter stating that it had in a single week in August shut down 1,128 stores, taken down more than 4 million listings and blocked 450,000 suspected counterfeit goods listings from being published. The company also disclosed that it had removed 500,715 items and closed more than 40 stores as of February 4, 2020 to protect consumers from counterfeit and substandard masks being sold by merchants hoping to profit amid pandemic.

On June 7, 2018, China Legal Evening News reported that Pinduoduo investigated and shut down stores and removed listings that violated its platform policy against pornography and violence, following an earlier report by the newspaper.

On January 20, 2019, Pinduoduo reported the theft by hackers of tens of millions of Yuan in coupons to the police. An online collective of users exploited a loophole in Pinduoduo's system and stole tens of millions of yuan worth of discount vouchers. The company notified the police about the incident.

On July 5, 2022, a Shanghai court dismissed a local resident's lawsuit accusing Pinduoduo of cheating in a promotional event.

In 2022, Pinduoduo was named on the Office of the United States Trade Representative's list of Notorious Markets for Counterfeiting and Piracy.

Honors and awards
Pinduoduo was one of three technology companies commended by China's central government for their contributions to poverty alleviation efforts.

In 2021, Pinduoduo won the Domestic E-Tailer of the Year — China award at the Retail Asia Awards for its work in transforming manufacturing with its consumer-to-manufacturer (C2M) innovation.

In 2022, Pinduoduo was the only Chinese company included in the American business magazine Fast Company's list of the top 10 most innovative logistics companies of 2022.

In 2022, Pinduoduo was awarded the ESG Initiative of the Year - China award at the 17th Retail Asia Awards for its efforts in creating more sustainable streams of income for small-scale farmers through online commerce.

References

External links

Chinese companies established in 2015
Internet properties established in 2015
Online marketplaces of China
Chinese brands
Companies based in Shanghai
2018 initial public offerings
Notorious markets